Breast prostheses are breast forms intended to look like breasts. They are often used temporarily or permanently by women after mastectomy or lumpectomy procedures, but may also be used by for aesthetic purposes. There are a number of materials and designs; although, the most common construction is gel (silicone or water-based) in a plastic film meant to feel similar to a person's skin. Prostheses may be purchased at a surgical supply store, pharmacy, custom lingerie shop, or even through private services that come to a person's home. There are many types of ready made breast prostheses including full or standard prostheses, partial prostheses such a shell prostheses, and stick on prostheses. Customized options are also available from specialty shops, which are moulded to fit an individual's chest by taking an impression of the breast(s). The areola and nipple may be replicated as part of the breast form or as separate nipple prosthesis. Both custom made and off-the shelf breast prostheses come in varieties that are designed to either be held in a pocket in a specially designed mastectomy bra or attached to the skin via adhesive or other methods and worn with a standard bra. There are many factors to consider when selecting breast prostheses such as different types and the care they require, insurance coverage, and psychosocial effects.

Uses 
External breast prostheses are commonly used in women who have undergone surgical treatment for breast cancer such as a mastectomy or lumpectomy. They have a variety of physical benefits including improved symmetry and balance, as well as psychological benefits such as improved self-confidence. Outside of post-surgical uses, prosthetics are also used by individuals to create the illusion of breasts.

Mastectomy 
Breast prostheses are most commonly used after a mastectomy, usually a consequence of cancer. They are often molded to mimic the natural shape of a woman's breast and can either be used temporarily or for long-term use as an alternative to, or prior to surgical breast reconstruction. Depending on the type of mastectomy performed, progress of post-operative healing, and other various factors, surgeons will determine the time when a woman can start to use a prosthesis. A prescription may be required for breast prostheses and mastectomy bras for insurance purposes.

Up to 90% of women use a prosthetic after surgery, temporarily or permanently. Over half of these women choose full weight options, while others will opt for more lightweight prosthetic devices. Some choose to make homemade prostheses, using materials such as rice and cotton.

Post-mastectomy bras 
Post-mastectomy bras are similar to regular bras with the exception of containing spandex stretch pockets on the inside that help keep the breast prosthesis in place. Post-mastectomy bras can be found at specialty shops or mastectomy boutiques and some shops are also willing to stitch pockets into regular bras and swimsuits.to hold prostheses.

Post-surgical camisoles 
Post-surgical camisoles are convenient for women to be used immediately after their breast surgery, especially if their breasts feel sore or sensitive. They are often made with soft cotton fabric and are designed to avoid rubbing or causing irritation to the skin. The camisoles have pockets for draining and similar to post-mastectomy bras, they have stitching to help hold fiber breast prosthesis in place. Right after breast surgery, women are advised to avoid or limit their arm and shoulder movement; camisoles are ideal for this reasons because they are pulled over the hip.

Attachable breast prostheses 
Attachable breast prostheses can be used as an alternative to post-mastectomy bras. Attachable breast prostheses can be attached directly to the skin via adhesives and can also be worn with a regular bra.

Homemade breast prostheses 
Some women may choose to re-purpose the supplies found in their homes to create homemade breast prostheses. For example, shoulder pads or nylons may be used as fillers for their bras. Homemade versions can be ideal for those who prefer loose-fitting clothes where the breast shape is not as defined.

Lumpectomy 
After a lumpectomy or a quadrantectomy individuals may be left with an asymmetrical silhouette. Breast prostheses can help to act as an equalizer to accommodate for the missing tissue. Examples of breast prostheses after small but not total breast tissue removal include partial breast prosthesis, and attachable breast prostheses (also known as a contact prostheses).

Partial breast prosthesis are available in a variety of materials such as silicone, foam, or fiber. These inserts are able to discretely fit into a regular bra or into the insert of a mastectomy bra.

Attachable breast prostheses anchor directly onto your body and are secured using adhesive or Velcro. Attachable prostheses can be custom made as a partial breast shape, as well as coming readily available in full sizes. These prostheses, unlike the partial prostheses, move independent of a bra and can be worn along with a regular bra. For those who do not want a bra specially designed for prostheses, an attachable option may be a consideration.

Breast enhancement

Transgender and Cross-dressing 
Many pre or non-hormonal trans women and men who cross-dress as women use breast prostheses in order to create the illusion of feminine breasts. They are sometimes combined with cleavage enhancement techniques when used with clothing with low necklines.

Full frontal cleavage tops are also available, mainly marketed to the transgender community. They incorporate a pair of breast prostheses in a one-piece skin coloured garment that is designed to provide the illusion of natural cleavage. Such garments have the disadvantage of having a visible top edge at the neck, which requires the wearing of a choker or similar necklace to hide the top edge of the garment. The edges of the breast prostheses are often distinguishable through the thin outer cover.

Psychosocial considerations 
After a lumpectomy or mastectomy, both physical and psychological health of women can be affected as an outcome of tissue removal. A breast prosthesis is an alternative post-surgical option to breast reconstruction to aid with these consequences. Breast tissue removal can leave women with an altered center of gravity, and could have negative impacts on posture as well as balance. A prosthesis may help to correct balance and posture deficiencies caused by tissue removal. Additionally, partial or full loss of a breast can result in loss of self-esteem for some women. As a result, they may have feelings of introversion, shyness, or insecurity about their new appearance. Breast prostheses may not only add to physical appearance, it may also have psychological benefits by providing a sense of femininity for women.

Types

Styles 

 Full/standard prosthesis - This prosthesis goes directly onto the breast wall and is used in those who have had all breast tissue removed. Size, shape and skin tone can be customized to match the other breast, or if both breasts have been removed, any size may be selected.
 Partial prosthesis - Partial prosthesis contain two layers of silicone with a thin layer of film to gently adhere to the breast. Unlike a full prosthesis, this can be used in situations where part of the breast has been removed. It is worn over the breast tissue inside the bra to create a fuller appearance and fill the breast outline.
 Shell prosthesis - When breasts differ in size from each other, this type of partial prosthesis can be used. A soft shell of made of silicon is placed around the smaller breast to help match the size of the larger one. Shell prosthesis can be used right after surgery and are ideal for periods of inactivity. They are typically made to have a polyester front with a breathable cotton backing and are lightweight.
 Stick-on prosthesis - This prosthesis sticks onto the skin and can be either full or partial. Women who have a more active lifestyle, or who wish to place less weight on their bra, prefer this prosthesis. Another benefit is that strapless clothing can be worn with this prosthesis, as long as the clothing can provide some support.
 Custom-made prosthesis - Some shops can customize prosthetics to match natural color, size of other breast, and the bodies natural contour. Silicon and latex materials are normally used, however these customized prosthetics are more expensive than those that are not custom made.

Shapes 
Non-customised prostheses are made of different shapes to suit the extent of breast tissue removal or the shape of a crossdresser's chest. Asymmetric breast forms incorporate an extension towards the armpit to replicate the shape of the tail of Spence, while symmetric "triangle" or "teardrop" prostheses do not incorporate that extension. Customised prostheses will mirror the other breast.

Weight 
Silicone breasts come in a variety of weights to fit the needs of the user and are typically designed to have the same weight as natural breasts. Lightweight forms that are about 20-40% lighter than the standard form are ideal for physical activity such as sports or for sleeping.

Temperature 
Some users find that prostheses can get hot in warm and humid climates, though newer breast prostheses are designed to allow for better air circulation. Using a bra pocket or a prosthesis cover may also help with perspiration, however, it is important to cleanse the prosthesis often to prevent the perspiration from damaging the prosthesis.

Skin tone 
Many prostheses are available in colors which can suit different skin tones. Additionally, while finding an exact match for any skin tone may be difficult, companies have begun to add custom color to breast prostheses in order to match different skin tones. There may also be covers available for the prosthesis that can provide an even closer match.

History 
Breast prostheses have a long history. In the 19th century they were made of rubber.  On 27 January 1874, a U.S. patent for a "breast pad" was issued to Frederick Cox (No. US 146805). His design consisted of rubber pads filled with air encased in cotton. Later in 1885, Charles L. Morehouse received US patent 326915 for his "Breast-Pad", made of natural rubber and inflatable with air at normal pressure. Newer designs such as that of Laura Wolfe's in 1904 parted with the air-filled design, which was prone to punctures, in favor of down feather and silk floss filling.

While breast forms were mainly sold for post-surgical purposes, over time the aesthetic potential of these prosthetics was explored. Breast form development increased in the mid 20th century as more companies began to sell and market a variety of breast forms with new materials made possible by chemical engineering advancements. Eventually, marketing for breast prosthetics expanded to target people other than cisgender women looking for a surgical prosthetic or cosmetic enhancement. Companies like NearlyMe created branded products for trans and non-binary individuals.

Other Considerations

Insurance 
Breast prostheses or mastectomy bras are covered by most insurances. To get these covered one should obtain a prescription from their physician with the diagnosis and a documentation of need. External breast prostheses are covered under Medicare part B following mastectomy; surgeries in the outpatient setting are also covered under Part B while part A covers mastectomy surgeries in the in patient setting. Custom-made prostheses are not usually covered by insurances due to their high costs.

Care 
Although breast prosthesis specific for swimming exist, extra care should be given to immediately rinse them after swimming to avoid damage from chlorine or saltwater. In general, a silicone breast prosthesis should be treated like one's own skin; it should be washed daily with soap and water and dried after. Some prosthesis may require additional or more specific care to keep it clean. Sharp objects such as brooches or pins should be avoided as they may puncture silicone breasts and cause leaking.

References 

Breast
Prosthetics
Gender-affirming surgery (male-to-female)